Nechama Tec (née Bawnik) (born 15 May 1931) is a Professor Emerita of Sociology at the University of Connecticut.  She received her Ph.D. in sociology at Columbia University, where she studied and worked with the sociologist Daniel Bell, and is a Holocaust scholar. Her book When Light Pierced the Darkness (1986) and her memoir Dry Tears: The Story of a Lost Childhood (1984) both received the Merit of Distinction Award from the Anti-Defamation League of B'nai B'rith.  She is also author of the book Defiance: The Bielski Partisans on which the film  Defiance (2008) is based, as well as a study of women in the Holocaust.  She was awarded the 1994 International Anne Frank Special Recognition prize for it.

Biography
She was born in Lublin, Poland to a family of Polish Jews in 1931 and was 8 years old when Nazi Germany invaded Poland in 1939.  She survived the Holocaust thanks to her life being saved by Polish Catholics.  After the war she emigrated to Israel and later moved to the United States, where she earned a doctorate at Columbia University.

She is the mother of film director Roland Tec.  Her daughter, Leora Tec, is the founder and Director of Bridge To Poland, an organization she created to break down stereotypes between Jews and non-Jewish Poles. Her husband, Dr. Leon Tec, was a noted child psychiatrist and author of Fear of Success and the autobiography, Adventure and Destiny.

Nechama Tec was initially shocked by the changes made in adapting her book to make the film Defiance. The Bielski partisans, for example, never actually went into battle against German tanks.  However, after seeing the film a number of times, she confessed to liking it "more and more."

Dr. Tec was appointed to the Council of the United States Holocaust Memorial Museum and served in 1995 as a Scholar in Residence at the International Institute for Holocaust Research at Yad Vashem, in Israel.

Works 

 Resistance: Jews and Christians Who Defied the Nazi Terror. University Press: Oxford 2013.
 Letters of Hope and Despair. University Press: Cambridge 2007.
 Resilience and Courage: Women, Men, and the Holocaust. University Press: Yale 2003.
 Defiance: The Bielski Partisans. University Press: Oxford 1993.
 In The Lion's Den: The Life of Oswald Rufeisen. University Press: Oxford 1990.
 When Light Pierced the Darkness: Christian Rescue of Jews in Nazi-Occupied Poland. University Press: Oxford 1986.
 Dry Tears: The Story of a Lost Childhood. University Press: Oxford 1984.
 Grass Is Green in Suburbia: A Sociological Study of Adolescent Usage of Illicit Drugs. Libra Pub 1974.

Lectures and articles
 Jewish Children: Between Protectors and Murderers. Center for Advanced Holocaust Studies - US Holocaust Memorial Museum: 2005.
 “Jewish Resistance: Fact, Omissions, and Distortions,”. Miles Lerman Center for the Study of Jewish Resistance. 1997.

Awards
 2002 National Jewish Book Award in the Holocaust category for Resilience and Courage: Women, Men and the Holocaust
2012 Prakhin International Literary Award "The Truth about Holocaust & Stalinist Repression" for the book Defiance: The Bielski Partisans.

References

External links
 Studio portrait of Nechama Bawnik taken in the Lublin ghetto. Photo Archives of US Holocaust Memorial Museum.

American sociologists
American women sociologists
Jewish American social scientists
Jewish American historians
Historians of the Holocaust
Holocaust survivors
American memoirists
University of Connecticut faculty
Columbia University alumni
American people of Polish-Jewish descent
Living people
1931 births